The 1962 Campeonato Brasileiro Série A (officially the 1962 Taça Brasil) was the 4th edition of the Campeonato Brasileiro Série A. It began on September 2, 1962, and ended on April 2, 1963.

Format 
The competition was a single elimination knockout tournament featuring two-legged ties, with a Tie-Break (play-off) if the sides were tied on points (however, if the tie-break was a draw, the aggregate score of the first two legs was used to determine the winner).

Teams 
18 State Champions qualified for the tournament.

Northern Zone

Northeastern Group

Northern Group

Northern Zone Final

Southern Zone

Southern Group

Eastern Group

Southern Zone Final

National Semi-Finals
Botafogo and Santos entered this stage.

National Final

References

External links
1962 Taça Brasil

Brazil
Taca Brasil
Taça Brasil seasons
B